Johann Zacharias Frey, or Jan Zachariasz Frey (June 1769, Vienna - 8 August 1829, Warsaw) was an Austrian engraver and painter who spent most of his career in Poland.

Biography
His father was an Austrian military officer. He initially studied painting at the Academy of Fine Arts, Vienna, then studied in London with Benjamin West.

In 1804, he was appointed court painter and engraver to Count Adam Jerzy Czartoryski. Most of the original engravings are now at the Czartoryski Museum.

Shortly after, he relocated to Warsaw, where he spent the rest of his life. In addition to his artistic activity, he was a teacher at the Piarist monastery school.

His first project there was a series of postcards, depicting national monuments, based on the drawings Zygmunt Vogel. In 1815, he illustrated On the Carpathian Region and Other Mountains of Poland by  Stanisław Staszic. The following year, he illustrated Historical Songs, with lyrics by Julian Ursyn Niemcewicz, set to music by Karol Kurpiński.

From 1808, he was a member of the Masonic Lodge. He was interred at the Protestant Reformed Cemetery, Warsaw, but his tomb has not survived.

His son, became a noted obstetrician.

Sources 
 Biography from the Biographisches Lexikon des Kaiserthums Oesterreich @ WikiSource

External links 

 More works by Frey @ the National Museum, Kraków

1769 births
1829 deaths
Austrian painters
Austrian engravers
Academy of Fine Arts Vienna alumni
Artists from Vienna
Austrian emigrants to Poland